Ingo Bodtke (born 6 June 1965 in Lutherstadt Eisleben) is a German politician from the FDP. He has been a member of the German Bundestag from Saxony-Anhalt since 2021.

Life
Ingo Bodtke grew up in a Christian home in the town of his birth. He completed an apprenticeship as a butcher and, after completing his basic military service, studied meat management and graduated as an engineer. He then worked as an instructor for insemination of cattle in animal breeding. He also worked in the insurance industry from 1987 and worked for LVM since 1990. Since the fall of the Berlin Wall, Bodtke has managed an insurance and financial agency as well as travel agencies.
Bodtke has been married since 1985 and is the father of four children.

Party and politics
Bodtke is a member of the Federal Committee on Religion & ideology in the FDP party.

Bodtke is a member of the Wimmelburg municipal council and holds a seat on the Mansfeld-Südharz district council, serving as FDP parliamentary group chairman since 2019. He is chairman of the association Liberaler Mittelstand Sachsen-Anhalt e. V. as well as assessor of the federal board of the federal association.

He ran in the federal constituency of Mansfeld in the 2021 federal election and in second place on the state list of the FDO Saxony-Anhalt. He missed the direct mandate with 8.4% of the first votes, but moved via the state list into the 20th German Bundestag. There he is a member of the Committee on Food and Agriculture, the Petitions Committee and alternate in the Committee on Labor and Social Affairs.

Honorary office
Member of the supervisory board of Verkehrsgesellschaft Südharz mbH
Conductor, organist and pastor at the New Apostolic Church in Hettstedt
Member of the Federal Executive Board of the Liberal Mittelstand

External links

 Biography at German Bundestag
 Website of Ingo Bodtke
 Ingo Bodtke at abgeordnetenwatch.de

References 

1965 births
Living people
People from Eisleben
Members of the Bundestag for the Free Democratic Party (Germany)
Members of the Bundestag for Saxony-Anhalt
21st-century German politicians
Politicians from Saxony-Anhalt
Free Democratic Party (Germany) politicians
Members of the Bundestag 2021–2025